Furcraea foetida (Giant Cabuya, Green-aloe or Mauritius-hemp) is a species of flowering plant native to the Caribbean and northern South America. It is widely cultivated and reportedly naturalized in many places (India, parts of Africa, Portugal, Australia, Thailand, Florida, New Zealand, and many oceanic islands)

Description

Furcraea foetida is an evergreen perennial subshrub, stemless or with a short stem up to 1 m tall. The leaves are sword-shaped, 1-1.8 m long and 10–15 cm broad at their widest point, narrowing to 6–7 cm broad at the leaf base, and to a sharp spine tip at the apex; the margins are entire or with a few hooked spines. The flowers are greenish to creamy white, 4 cm long, and strongly scented; they are produced on a large inflorescence up to 7.5 m tall.

Cultivation
The plant is cultivated in subtropical and tropical regions for products and as an ornamental plant for gardens. Its leaves are used to produce a natural fiber similar to sisal.

References

Huxley, A. (1992). New RHS Dictionary of Gardening. Macmillan.

External links
 

foetida
Flora of the Caribbean
Flora of northern South America
Garden plants of North America
Garden plants of South America
Plants described in 1753
Taxa named by Carl Linnaeus
Flora without expected TNC conservation status